Sangilithevan is a 1960 Indian Tamil language film produced by A. L. Srinivasan and directed by B. R. Panthulu. The film stars S. S. Rajendran and Rajasulochana.

Plot

Cast 
The following list was adapted from the database of Film News Anandan

Male cast
S. S. Rajendran
T. S. Balaiah
V. K. Ramasamy
T. K. Ramachandran
S. A. Natarajan

Female cast
Rajasulochana
P. S. Gnanam
Pushpavalli
Suryakala

Production 
The film was produced by A. L. Srinivasan under his own banner A. L. S. Productions, and was directed by B. R. Panthulu. Sakthi Krishnaswamy wrote the story and dialogues. Cinematography was handled by M. Karnan while the editing was done by R. Devan. P. B. Chowthi and Vaduvugar were in charge of art direction. Choreography was done by Chinni, Sampath and M. S. Muthukrishnan. Still photography was by Thiruchi K. Arunachalam. The film was processed at Vijaya lab.

Soundtrack 
The music was composed by T. G. Lingappa while the lyrics were penned by Pattukkottai Kalyanasundaram, Kannadasan, K. D. Santhanam, Ku. Ma. Balasubramaniam and K. S. Gopalakrishnan.

References

External links 

1960s Tamil-language films
Films directed by B. R. Panthulu
Films scored by T. G. Lingappa